The 2013–14 Football League Championship was the 129th season in the history of Millwall Football Club. It was their 88th season in the Football League and 39th in the second tier of English football. It was Millwall's fourth continuous season in the Championship, after promotion from the Football League One in 2010.

The season marked Steve Lomas's first season in charge of Millwall, after being appointed in pre-season. The club sacked Lomas on 26 December 2013, after he won only five of his 22 games in charge. Ian Holloway was appointed as his permanent replacement on 4 January 2014.

Millwall were eliminated from the FA Cup in the third round and from the Football League Cup in the second round. The club finished the season in 19th position in the league, four points above the relegation places.

Matches

Pre-season

Football League Championship

Millwall kicked off their season at home to Yeovil Town, marking their 20th anniversary at The Den.

August

September

October

November

December

January

February

March

April

May

FA Cup

Millwall entered the FA Cup at the third round stage with other Championship and Premier League clubs. The draw was made in December 2013 with the ties taking place on 4 January 2014. Millwall were drawn against Southend United, to whom they lost 4–1.

Football League Cup

Millwall played their second competitive South London derby against AFC Wimbledon in the first round of the Football League Cup.

League table

Results summary

Result round by round

Kit
For this season, Millwall chose Prostate Cancer UK to sponsor their shirt for free.

Squad statistics

Appearances and goals

|-
|colspan="14"|Players who featured for club, who have left:

Top scorers

Disciplinary record

Squad

Detailed overview

Squad
As of start of the season

Transfers
All transfers updated as of 5 November 2013

In

 Total spending:  ~ £0
Notes

Loans in

Out

Loans out

Contracts

References

External links
Official Website

Millwall F.C. seasons
Millwall